Punta Mariato or Mariato Point (Spanish Punta Mariato) is a cape in western Panama and is the southernmost point on the mainland of North America and is one of the Extreme points of Earth.

Geography

Punta Mariato is situated in the southern part of the Veraguas Province in central Panama.

The cape is located on the southwestern tip of the Azuero Peninsula directly on the Pacific Ocean about 15 km south of Arenas and about 70 km west of Tonosi and roughly 350 km southwest of Panama City.

Punta Mariato is uninhabited and covered by mangrove and rainforest and is part of the 33 400 hectare (8255 acres) large nature reserve Parque nacional Cerro Hoya (Cerro Hoya National Park). The reserve which extends into neighbouring Los Santos Province is classified as a biosphere reserve by UNESCO.

The area is hard to reach as there are few roads but the waters around the cape are popular for surfing and recreational fishing.

Punta Mariato is part of "Distrito de Mariato" (Mariato District).

History
Parque nacional Cerro Hoya was established on October 2, 1984, and is home of most of the remaining jungle habitat in the Azuero region  and is also habitat for a number of endangered species.

See also
List of lighthouses in Panama

References

External links
 About Punta Mariato
 Map of Punta Mariato
 Image of Punta Mariato
 Picture of the lighthouse

Headlands of Panama
Panamanian coasts of the Pacific Ocean
Extreme points of Earth
Lighthouses in Panama
Veraguas Province